Alien Resurrection: Complete Motion Picture Score is the official soundtrack album of the 1997 science fiction film Alien Resurrection. Composed by John Frizzell, the soundtrack features themes such as romance and eroticism. Taking seven months to write and record, Frizzell included strange sound elements such as a gong and rub rods, to create a unique score. It was released on November 11, 1997.

Reviews
Steven McDonald of Allmusic thought it was "A dark and stormy score that fits the cold atmosphere of the film perfectly", awarding 4 out of 5 stars. Matt Peterson of Track Sounds, however, was negative stating, "it is quite disarrayed and incoherent. The lack of any solid thematic material hurts the viability of this music for the film, and destroys its listening potential on CD." John Fallon of JoBlo.com felt it was "An adequate score that supports its whacked out scenes properly."

Track listing

Personnel
John Frizzell – composer, producer
Artie Kane – conductor
Patrick Weber – engineer 
Tom Hardisty – engineer (assistance)
Joe Gastwirt – mastering 
Ramon Breton – mastering
René Mandel – mastering
Mark Cross – producer

Expanded Edition

La-La Land Records released an expanded limited edition album (catalogue number LLLCD 1145) on October 5, 2010, including the original 1997 release (track 9 onwards on disc 2). The record was limited to 3500 copies. The CD booklet contains exclusive detailed liner notes.

Disc 1
 Main Title (2:12)
 Entering the Ship (containing "Main Title (Ripley's Theme)" from Alien, composed by Jerry Goldsmith) (1:21)
 Post-Op (1:21)
 Make Us Proud/Meat By-Product (1:58)
 Fiora 16/Inbred (1:51)
 Docking the Betty (1:19)
 Face Huggers (2:11)
 Basketball/Foot Massage/Fast Learner (3:56)
 Call Finds Ripley (5:01)
 Gun Fight (1:17)
 The Aliens Escape (6:36)
 Hose/Elgyn's Death/Ripley Believe It (3:57)
 Twelve/Vriess Reappears/Telling Vriess (4:09)
 Ripley Meets Her Clones (3:43)
 After Tube Blow Up (1:18)
 What's Inside Purvis? (4:25)
 They Swim... (8:58)
 Call's Fake (1:47)
 The Chapel (3:17)
 Mean Streak (1:42)
 The Abduction (3:50)
 Birth of the Newborn (4:52)

Disc 2
 Call Meets the Newborn (6:09)
 Ripley and the Newborn (3:14)
 Finale (1:59)
 Alien March (End Credits) (3:26)
 Main Title (alternate) (2:15)
 Elgyn's Death (alternate) (3:03)
 Finale (alternate-brass version) (1:58)
 Finale (alternate #2) (1:51)
 The Original 1997 Soundtrack Album: Main Title (2:08)
 Post-Op (1:20)
 Docking the Betty (1:17)
 Priva Son D'Ogni Conforto (from Handel's Julius Caesar) – sung by Maureen Forrester (5:28)
 Face Huggers (2:12)
 Call Finds Ripley (3:02)
 The Aliens Escape (4:13)
 Ripley Meets Her Clones (2:20)
 What's Inside Purvis? (2:27)
 They Swim... (6:27)
 The Chapel (2:35)
 The Abduction (3:34)
 The Battle With the Newborn (6:03)
 Ripley's Theme (2:12)

References

Alien (franchise) soundtracks
1997 soundtrack albums
RCA Records soundtracks